Jesús Zavala may refer to:

 Jesús Zavala (footballer) (born 1987), Mexican footballer
 Jesús Zavala (actor) (born 1991), Mexican actor and singer